Aarne "Aake" Kalliala (born 5 October 1950, Heinola) is a Finnish actor. He is best known for appearing on comedy-sketch shows such as Pulttibois (with Pirkka-Pekka Petelius).

Partial filmography
 Hamlet Goes Business (Hamlet liikemaailmassa, 1987)
 Farewell, Mr. President (1987)
 Onks' Viljoo näkyny? (1988)
 Uuno Turhapuro – Suomen tasavallan herra presidentti (1992)
 Kummeli Goldrush (Kummeli Kultakuume, 1997)
 On the Road to Emmaus (Emmauksen tiellä, 2001)
 Trench Road (Juoksuhaudantie, 2004)
 Kummelin Jackpot (2006)
 Man Exposed (Riisuttu mies, 2006)
 Three Wise Men (Kolme viisasta miestä, 2008)
 Rally On! (Ralliraita, 2009)
 Backwood Philosopher (Havukka-ahon ajattelija, 2009)
 Home Sweet Home (Kotirauha, 2011)
 The Path of the Righteous Men (Vares – Kaidan tien kulkijat, 2012)
 Road North (Tie pohjoiseen, 2012)
 The Hijack That Went South (Kaappari, 2012)
 Rendel (2017)

References

External links

1950 births
Living people
People from Heinola
20th-century Finnish male actors
Finnish male television actors
21st-century Finnish male actors